Julian Harcourt Ferguson (2 June 1895 – 6 May 1965) was a Progressive Conservative party member of the House of Commons of Canada. He was born in Barrie, Ontario and had careers in insurance and manufacturing.

He was first elected at the Simcoe North riding in the 1945 general election and re-elected there in 1949 and 1953. After the end of his final term, the 22nd Canadian Parliament, Ferguson left the House of Commons and did not seek re-election in the 1957 election

Ferguson's granduncle was Thomas Roberts Ferguson, a member of Ontario's first Legislative Assembly and of Canada's first Parliament.

References

External links
 

1895 births
1965 deaths
Members of the House of Commons of Canada from Ontario
People from Barrie
Progressive Conservative Party of Canada MPs